Family Plan is a 1997 American comedy film directed by Fred Gerber. It stars Leslie Nielsen and Judge Reinhold.  It is the second movie in which Nielsen portrayed Harry Haber, the first being Rent-a-Kid.

Plot
Saul Reubens, an old millionaire (Harry Morgan) died and left everything to his niece Julie (Emily Procter), including a children's summer camp "Sedona". Julie's fiancé Jeffrey (Judge Reinhold) wants to sell this camp to rich investors, so he transforms the camp into an adult health resort without telling Julie and invites investors to take a rest there.

At the same time Harry Haber (Leslie Nielsen), after a misunderstanding about a scheduling conflict, takes the children up from Mid Valley Children House to the now-adult health resort. Two brothers from there, Alec and Eli Mackenzie, recently lost their dad in a car accident and are trying to find their biological mother. According to their case, their mother lives in Phoenix, Arizona, which Camp Sedona is located near to. The two brothers decided to run away while at the camp to find their mother. But right before all the children go to camp, Alec (Trevor Morgan) is busted for some tricks by the children house principal (Tony Rosato) and grounded – he isn't going to camp.

Eli (Zachary Browne) helps Alec to get to the camp inside of big bag with clothes; now he is secretly there without permission. But he can still have fun with the adult investors.

Various shenanigans are done by the kids and other members of the camp much to the frustration of Jeffrey, whose investors are not fond of kids (one time going so far as to hide insects in guests' food). Another incident involves the filming of a sleeping woman through her bedroom window. After being caught they flee and while hiding, record a conversation between Jeffery and an investor.

Alec is caught after climbing a dangerous cliff to retrieve RC plane causing other kids to go get the adults.

Before movie night Jeffery shows Julie his "sensitive side" in a desperate ploy to get her to sell the camp. Unfortunately for him, Harry had come across the recording the boys made earlier and puts it in the TV for everyone to watch. The woman who was filmed sleeping storms off and Jeffery pauses the movie several times but each time Harry resumes it ensuring they get to the part of Jeffery's conversation. This causes Julie to declare the camp not for sale, dump Jeffery, and then punch him.

The boys leave in the middle of the movie and stow away in a catering service's van heading to Phoenix. Julie and Matt (Eddie Bowz), who is working in camp and is Julie's childhood friend, go after them by car but don't beat them to the catering company's building. While Julie and Matt look for the brothers in the van, they get in Julie's car to look at a map during which they answer a phone call from Harry who they somewhat nonsensically tell, "Sorry, wrong number." Slightly puzzled Harry tells the principle there is no answer.

Julie and Matt get back into the car while unbeknownst to them the brothers hide in the back. The principle tells Julie and Matt on the phone to head to the address of the kids' mom and Harry somewhat cryptically adds they shouldn't "Say anything they wouldn't normally say in the presence of uh small people." Harry assures the principle that Eli and Alec are in good hands.

Julie and Matt head to the address and the brothers jump out of the car and run to the door. Unfortunately, there are new owners at the address who don't know the previous owners.

Finally, Matt decides to adopt Eli and Alec, whom he had grown very fond of, only to find out Julie also wanted to adopt them and seeing Matt want kids, realizes he is ready for commitment.

Cast
Leslie Nielsen as Harry Haber
Judge Reinhold as Jeffrey Chase
Eddie Bowz as Matt Nolan
Emily Procter as Julie Rubins
Tony Rosato as Cliff Haber
Bill LeVasseur as Head Camp Counselor
Zachary Browne as Eli Mackenzie
Trevor Morgan as Alec Mackenzie
 Harry Morgan as Sol Rubins

References

External links

1997 films
1997 comedy films
American comedy films
Films scored by Lee Holdridge
Initial Entertainment Group films
1990s English-language films
1990s American films